Jebel Umm Arafieb is a volcanic field in Sudan, also known as Jebel Umm Marafieb.

References

Umm Arafieb
Umm Arafieb